Thiosalicylic acid is an organosulfur compound containing carboxyl and sulfhydryl functional groups. Its molecular formula is C6H4(SH)(CO2H). it is a yellow solid that is slightly soluble in water, ethanol and diethyl ether, and alkanes, but more soluble in DMSO.

Preparation
Thiosalicylic acid can be prepared from anthranilic acid via diazotization followed by the addition of sodium sulfide and then reduction with zinc.

Uses
Thiosalicylic acid is a precursor to the dyestuff thioindigo. It is also used to make the vaccine preservative thiomersal. It is a precursor to drug candidates for treatment of atherosclerosis and melanoma. The preservative benzisothiazolinone is prepared from thiosalicylic acid.

References

Benzoic acids
Thiols